Hanover Square Historic District may refer to:

 Hanover Square Historic District (Horseheads, New York)
 Hanover Square Historic District, centered on Hanover Square, Syracuse, New York